Immortalizer is the fourth studio album by the American rock band Valient Thorr, released in 2008.

Track listing
 "I Hope the Ghosts of the Dead Haunt Yr Soul Forever" – 3:21
 "Infinite Lives" – 3:20
 "Mask of Sanity" – 4:19
 "Tomorrow Police" – 4:26
 "No Holds Barred" 3:41
 "Parable of Daedalus" – 4:18
 "Birdhead Looking at Goldenhands" – 3:15
 "Vernal Equinox" – 1:18
 "1000 Winters in a Row" – 4:36
 "Red Flag" – 2:58
 "Nomadic Sacrifice" – 4:07
 "Steeplechase" – 3:15
 "Tackle the Walrus" – 4:18
 "Untitled" – 0:36

References

External links
http://www.volcoment.com/eCom/details.asp?cid=3&sid=&pid=504

2008 albums
Valient Thorr albums
Volcom Entertainment albums
Albums produced by Jack Endino